Rosling is a surname. Notable people with the surname include:

George Rosling (1900–1973), American judge
Hans Rosling (1948–2017), Swedish physician, academic, statistician, and public speaker
Ola Rosling (born 1975), Swedish statistician

See also
Roslin (disambiguation)